Malacoctenus boehlkei, the Diamond blenny, is a species of labrisomid blenny native to the central western Atlantic Ocean and the Caribbean Sea where it is an inhabitant of coral reefs at depths of from .  This species can reach a length of  TL. The specific name honour the ichthyologist James E. Böhlke (1930-1982), of the Academy of Natural Sciences of Philadelphia.

References

External links
 

boehlkei
Fauna of the Bahamas
Fish of the Caribbean
Taxa named by Victor G. Springer
Fish described in 1959